Tangará is a municipality in the state of Rio Grande do Norte in the Northeast region of Brazil.

See also
 List of municipalities in Rio Grande do Norte
 Tangara (disambiguation)

References

Municipalities in Rio Grande do Norte